Content-ID may refer to:

 Content ID (system), a digital fingerprinting system used to identify and manage copyrighted content on YouTube
 URI scheme (cid:), allows the use of MIME within email